Chapada dos Veadeiros National Park is a national park of Brazil located in the state of Goiás, on the top of an ancient plateau with an estimated age of 1.8 billion years. The park was created on January 11, 1961, by President Juscelino Kubitschek, and listed as a World Heritage Site by Unesco in 2001. The park is maintained by Chico Mendes Institute for Biodiversity Conservation.

History 

The Chapada dos Veadeiros region was first developed around the golden mine rush in the 18th century. Cavalcante was one of the first villages founded in the region, and at one point became one of Brazil's major gold extractors. Some reports say that Isabel, Princess Imperial of Brazil visited Cavalcante, making it capital of the Empire for a day. The necessity of slave labor to work the mines in the Chapada dos Veadeiros was so great that the region is now home to some of the biggest Quilombo communities in Brazil.

Kalungas 

The Quilombos are communities of Afro-Brazilians who managed to escape from slavery, both from agricultural plantations and mines. The Quilombo communities of Chapada dos Veadeiros include a subgroup known as the Kalungas. The word Kalunga meant "something of smaller value" in the past. The term is now a term of pride for the Kalunga group. Their image in Brazil has grown. With the end of the golden period of mining, the Chapada dos Veadeiros had only an isolated collection of villages; they were rediscovered and engage in tourism to support Kalunga communities.

Geography

Climate 
The average yearly temperature is 24–26 degrees Celsius, ranging from a minimum of 4–8 degrees Celsius and reaching a maximum of 40–42 degrees Celsius.

Altitude 
With altitudes between 600 and 1650 meters, it is the highest plain in Central Brazil. The highest point of the park and of the state of Goiás is Serra da Santana, at 1691 meters above sea level.

Rock formations 
Its rock formations are one of the oldest on the planet. There are quartz with outcrops of crystals. These rocks are exported and appreciated in Japan and England, where for some decades they were used for industrial work. Nowadays therapists and nature lovers seek energies and the power to cure from the crystals and from places like Alto Paraiso.

Rock crystals are present in the soil of the rich cerrado, or open pasture. Forest growth is also still found in the region, where more than 25 species of orchids can be found, besides other Brazilian species such as pau d'arco roxo, copaíba (copa tree), aroeira (California pepper tree), tamanqueira (cork tree), terivá (a variety of palm tree), buritis (wine-palm) and Babaçu (Babassu).

The main river in the park is the Rio Preto, a tributary of the Tocantins River. There are many waterfalls along its course such as the Rio Preto Falls (120 meters high, 80 meters at the base) and the Cariocas Falls.

List of waterfalls 
Chapada dos Veadeiros National Park is noted for its waterfalls. Those which range from 80 to 120 meters include the Corredeiras, Cannyon I, Cannyon II, the Carioquinhas Waterfall and the Jardim de Maitréya. In properties with controlled access: Águas Quentes, Morada do Sol, Banho das Crianças and Vale das Andorinhas, Salto do Raizama and Cannyon do Rio São Miguel, Vale da lua, Cachoeiras Almécegas I and Almécegas II, Cachoeira de São Bento, Cataratas do Rio dos Couros, Cachoeira do Rio Cristal, Cachoeira dos Anjos e dos Arcanjos, Água Fria, Cachoeira do Rio das Almas, Poço Encantado, Sertão Zen, Cachoeira do Rio Macaco, Território Kalunga, Lago Serra da Mesa, Bocaina do Faria, Cachoeira das Neves, Mirante do Pouso Alto, Alpes Goianos, Cachoeira do Santana, Cachoeira da Ave Maria, Morada do Sol, Pedra Escrita, Cachoeira das Pedras Bonitas, Cachoeira Santa Bárbara, Cachoeira Capivara, Cachoeira Candaru, Cachoeiras Barroco, Cachoeiras do Pratinha, Cachoeira Rei do Prata, Cachoeiras do Curriola, Cachoeira do São Bartolomeu, Cachoeiras Veredas, and Ponte de Pedra.

The local fauna 

The rich fauna of the region includes species, some of which are threatened by extinction, such as the pampas deer (locally known as veado campeiro), marsh deer (cervo do pantanal), maned wolf (lobo guará), jaguar, and others like the rhea (ema), seriema, tapeti, giant armadillo (tatu canastra), anteater (tamanduá), capybara (capivara), tapir (anta), green-beaked toucan (tucano de bico verde), black vulture (urubu preto), and the king vulture (urubu rei).

References

External links 

 Info on the Chapada
 Chapada dos Veadeiros at Webventure
 Brazil Ministry of the Environment page about the park
 Brazil Ministry of the Environment technical details about the park

National parks of Brazil
World Heritage Sites in Brazil
Protected areas of Goiás
Highest points of Brazilian states
Protected areas established in 1961
Cerrado